USS Riette (SP-107) was an armed motorboat that served in the United States Navy as a patrol vessel from 1917 to 1919.
 
Riette was built as the civilian motorboat Amalia III in 1916 by the Twentieth Century Yacht, Launch, and Engine Company at Morris Heights, New York. She was soon renamed Temegan II and then Riette.  The U.S. Navy acquired Riette from her owner, Dr. George G. Shelton of Ridgefield, Connecticut, on 19 May 1917 for use as a patrol boat during World War I. She was commissioned on 5 August 1917 as USS Riette (SP-107) at the New York Navy Yard in Brooklyn, New York.

Riette served as a patrol vessel at Base No. 3, Port Jefferson, New York, in late 1917 and at Base No. 2, Black Rock, in Bridgeport, Connecticut, from May 1918 to July 1918. From 13 August 1918 she was based at Iona Island, New York. She later provided special service for the Machinery Division at the New York Navy Yard.

Riette was decommissioned on 14 August 1919. She was sold on 30 October 1919 at Brooklyn to H. H. Miller of Brooklyn.

Re-engined in 1922 and again in 1930, Riette remained on yacht registers until 1958.

References

Department of the Navy Naval Historical Center Online Library of Selected Images: U.S. Navy Ships: USS Riette (SP-107), 1917-1919. Previously the civilian motor boat Riette
NavSource Online: Section Patrol Craft Photo Archive: Riette (SP 107)

Patrol vessels of the United States Navy
World War I patrol vessels of the United States
Ships built in Morris Heights, Bronx
1916 ships